Karosa B 931 is an urban bus produced by bus manufacturer Karosa from the Czech Republic, in the years of 1996 to 2002. Modernised version B931E was introduced in 1999. It was succeeded by Karosa B 951 in 2002.

Construction features 
Karosa B 931 is a model of the Karosa 900 series. The B 931 is derived from the Karosa B 731 city bus, and also unified with city bus models such as the B 941 and the B 932. The body is semi-self-supporting with frame and engine with automatic gearbox in the rear part. The engine drives only the rear axle. The front axle is independent, rear axle is solid. All axles are mounted on Air suspension. On the right side are three doors (first are narrower than middle doors). Inside are used plastic Vogelsitze or Fainsa seats. The driver's cab is separated from the rest of the vehicle by a glazed partition (protype BK1 made in the year 1995 didn't have this partition). In the middle part is room for a pram or wheelchair.

Production and operation 

Prototype of Karosa B931 was built in 1995. It was bought in 1996 by Prague transport company and operated until 2012.
First ten serial buses were made at the end of 1995 for Prague transport company.
In 1996 started serial production, which continued until 2002. Since 1999 were buses produced only in modernised version B931E, which has new solid front axle Škoda-LIAZ, floor lowered in front part by 10 centimeters, ABS and ASR.

Currently, number of Karosa B931 buses is decreasing, due to supply of new low-floor buses, for example by SOR NB 12 made in Czech Republic.

{Clear}

Historical vehicles 
 Unknown owner (bus ex. DP Plzeň no. 433)
 Technical museum in Brno (1 bus B931.1675 no. 7425, year 1998)

See also 

 List of buses

Buses manufactured by Karosa
Buses of the Czech Republic